4-Way Diablo is the seventh studio album by American rock band Monster Magnet. It was recorded in four different studios: Sound City Studios, American Studios, The Sunset Lodge and  Hydeaway Studios (all during 2006 and 2007). It was released in 2007, November 5 in Europe and November 6 in the United States where it sold 1,800 copies on its first week of release.
This album doesn't feature guitarist Phil Caivano.

Following the album's release, none of its songs were included in the concert sets. According to lead vocalist Dave Wyndorf, they were not written as live songs, and he determined that they were too delicate to work as such. But he stated that it will change someday when he assembles a mellow set.

Track listing
All tracks written by Dave Wyndorf except where stated.

 "4-Way Diablo" – 3:19
 "Wall of Fire" – 3:44
 "You're Alive" – 4:03
 "Blow Your Mind" – 4:27
 "Cyclone" – 5:32
 "2000 Light Years from Home" – 4:51 (Mick Jagger, Keith Richards)
 "No Vacation" – 5:01
 "I'm Calling You" – 4:21
 "Solid Gold" – 5:51
 "Freeze and Pixillate" – 4:25
 "A Thousand Stars" – 5:29
 "Slap in the Face" – 4:26
 "Little Bag of Gloom" – 2:18
 "Tomorrow's Sun" [Vinyl Exclusive Bonustrack] – 5:25

Track 6 is a Rolling Stones cover, from their 1967 psychedelic rock album Their Satanic Majesties Request.
Track 7 "No Vacation" is a remake of "Atom Age Vampire", from Dave Wyndorf's 1988 "Love Monster" Demos.

Personnel
Dave Wyndorf – lead vocals, rhythm guitar
Ed Mundell – lead guitar
Bob Pantella – drums
Jim Baglino – bass

Charts

References

Monster Magnet albums
2007 albums
SPV/Steamhammer albums
Albums recorded at Sound City Studios